Alexander Zhdanov (25 January 1951 – 21 February 2021) was a Russian actor who was a Merited Artist of the Russian Federation.

Biography
Zhdanov graduated from the Leningrad Conservatory in 1974 and became an actor at the Liteyny Theatre. He also acted in many films.

Alexander Zhdanov died in Saint Petersburg on 21 February 2021, at the age of 70.

Filmography
Monologue (1972)
 (1972)
Failure of Engineer Garin (1973)
 (1973)
 (1974)
Diary of a School Director (1975)
Truffaldino from Bergamo (1976)
 (1978)
Pugachev (1978)
The Wind of Travel (1978)
Say a Word for the Poor Hussar (1981)
 (1982)
Charlotte's Necklace (1984)
 (1986)
Russian Symphony (1994)
 (2000)
Streets of Broken Lights (2000)
 (2019)

References

1951 births
2021 deaths
Russian actors
Soviet actors
People's Artists of Russia
Place of birth missing